The 2013 Italian presidential election was held in Italy on 18–20 April 2013. The result was the re-election of Giorgio Napolitano, the first time a president had been elected for a second term.

Only members of Parliament and regional delegates were entitled to vote, most of these electors having been elected in the 2013 general election. As head of state of the Italian Republic, the president has a role of representation of national unity and guarantees that Italian politics comply with the Italian Constitution, in the framework of a parliamentary system.

Procedure
In accordance with the Italian Constitution, the election was held in the form of a secret ballot, with the Senators, the Deputies and 58 regional representatives entitled to vote. The election was held in the Palazzo Montecitorio, home of the Chamber of Deputies, with the capacity of the building expanded for the purpose. The first three ballots required a two-thirds majority of the 1,007 voters in order to elect a president, or 672 votes. Starting from the fourth ballot, an absolute majority was required for candidates to be elected, or 504 votes. The presidential mandate lasts seven years. The term of the incumbent president, Giorgio Napolitano, was due to end on 15 May 2013.

The election was presided over by the President of the Chamber of Deputies Laura Boldrini, who proceeded to the public counting of the votes, and by the President of the Senate Pietro Grasso.

Proposed candidates 
These candidates were officially proposed as president and voted in at least one ballot, by parties, coalitions or parliamentary groups which took part in the election.

Elected president

Other candidates

Withdrawn candidates

Chronology
On 16 April 2013, the Five Star Movement (M5S), following an online vote from party members, announced its support for investigative journalist Milena Gabanelli, and the party's leader Beppe Grillo indicated that the party might be willing to form a coalition government with the centre-left coalition if she were elected president with the coalition's support. On 17 April, after Gabanelli and Gino Strada withdrew from consideration, the M5S announced its support for Stefano Rodotà, a former President of the Data Protection Authority, member of the Chamber of Deputies, Member of the European Parliament, and president of the Democratic Party of the Left (PDS).

On 17 April Pier Luigi Bersani, leader of the Democratic Party (PD), put forward Franco Marini, a former leader of the Italian Confederation of Workers' Trade Unions (CISL), leader of the Italian People's Party (PPI) and President of the Italian Senate, as his party's candidate for president. Marini was selected having received the support of centre-right parties, notably The People of Freedom (PdL), Civic Choice (SC), Lega Nord (LN) and the Union of the Centre (UdC). However, Matteo Renzi, mayor of Florence and leader of a party minority, several Democratic Party lawmakers and Left Ecology Freedom (SEL) stated that they would not support Marini.

On 18 April, Marini received just 521 votes in the first ballot, short of the 672 needed, as more than 200 centre-left delegates rebelled. In the run-up of the second ballot Marini's candidacy was retired. The first two rounds' inconclusive results were interpreted as showing turmoil within the centre-left. As results of apparent jokes by electors, a number of implausible candidates, such as football manager Roberto Mancini and porn star Rocco Siffredi, received individual votes.

On 19 April, the PD and SEL selected Romano Prodi, a former Prime Minister and President of the European Commission, to be their candidate in the fourth ballot. Despite the fact that his candidacy had received unanimous support among the two parties' delegates, Prodi obtained only 395 votes in the fourth ballot as more than 100 centre-left electors did not vote for him. After the vote, Bersani announced his resignation from party secretary and Prodi pulled out of the race.

On 20 April incumbent President Giorgio Napolitano, holder of the post since 2006, agreed to run for another term in an attempt to break the parliamentary deadlock with the aim of safeguarding the continuity of the country's institutions.

Parties' voters
The number of seats per party was as follows:

Results
In the first three ballots the required majority was 672 votes. Further ballots require a simple majority of electors, in this case 504 votes.

Berlusconi and his coalition refused to support the PD's Fourth Round choice of Romano Prodi, claiming he was unacceptable as a compromise candidate. As a result, leaders from all political parties except for Beppe Grillo turned to Napolitano and held discussions with him in order to convince him to run again. Even though he had openly stated his refusal to consider running again in an interview a week before, Napolitano reluctantly agreed, and the party leaders subsequently urged electors to back him as a show of unity.

Napolitano was comfortably re-elected, having garnered the support of centre-left leader Pier Luigi Bersani, former Prime Minister and centre-right leader Silvio Berlusconi, and interim PM and centrist Mario Monti.

First ballot

Second ballot

Third ballot

Fourth ballot

Fifth ballot

Sixth ballot

Reactions
After the election results were announced, demonstrations took place outside Palazzo Montecitorio against the re-election of Napolitano. A sizable number of protesters were supporters of the Five Star Movement led by Beppe Grillo. Grillo himself condemned Napolitano's re-election, claiming this was a "coup d'état."

Pier Luigi Bersani promised to resign as leader of the PD in response to the lack of support within his coalition for Romano Prodi, the party's preference for president on the fourth ballot. Following his resignation, former trade union leader Guglielmo Epifani was elected in his place on 11 May 2013.

Notes

References

2013 elections in Italy
2013
April 2013 events in Italy